Kirell Brahndon Paco Montalbo (born April 2, 1996) is a Filipino professional basketball player for the TNT Tropang Giga of the Philippine Basketball Association (PBA).

Professional career

TNT Tropang Giga (2021–Present)
Montalbo was drafted 11th overall by the TNT Tropang Giga in the 2019 PBA draft.

PBA career statistics

As of the end of 2021 season

Season-by-season averages

|-
| align=left | 
| align=left | TNT
| 17 || 11.5 || .250 || .226 || .500 || 1.5 || .4 || .8 || .2 || 1.7
|-
| align=left | 
| align=left | TNT
| 32 || 16.4 || .477 || .436 || .708 || 1.4 || 1.5 || .7 || .1 || 6.4
|-class=sortbottom
| align="center" colspan=2 | Career
| 49 || 14.7 || .431 || .384 || .692 || 1.5 || 1.1 || .7 || .1 || 4.8

References

1996 births
Living people
Filipino men's basketball players
Point guards
Shooting guards
TNT Tropang Giga draft picks
TNT Tropang Giga players
De La Salle Green Archers basketball players
Philippines men's national basketball team players